Fred Wooller (born 21 October 1938) is a former Australian rules footballer who played with Geelong in the VFL.

Football
Recruited from Bacchus Marsh, Wooller started his career as a full forward and topped Geelong's goalkicking with 56 goals in 1957, his tally being the equal second highest in the league for that season. He was rewarded with selection in the interstate carnival where he represented Victoria.

He was the Geelong's leading goalkicker again in 1959 as well as in 1960, where he played at centre half forward and won the Carji Greeves Medal for the club's best and fairest.

On 6 July 1963 he was a member of the Geelong team that were comprehensively and unexpectedly beaten by Fitzroy, 9.13 (67) to 3.13 (31) in the 1963 Miracle Match.

In 1963 he became club captain and led his side into the grand final. He kicked 3 goals and helped Geelong win their 6th premiership.

See also
 1963 Miracle Match

References

External links

Australian rules footballers from Victoria (Australia)
Geelong Football Club players
Geelong Football Club Premiership players
Geelong Football Club captains
Carji Greeves Medal winners
Penguin Football Club players
People from Bacchus Marsh
1938 births
Living people
One-time VFL/AFL Premiership players